The Detroit, Howell and Lansing Railroad is a defunct railroad which operated in central and southeast Michigan during the early 1870s. The company formed on March 29, 1870 through the consolidation of the Detroit and Howell and the Howell and Lansing.

On March 16, 1871 the company consolidated with the Ionia and Lansing to form the Detroit, Lansing & Lake Michigan. The company had existed as an independent entity for less than a year.

Notes

References 

Railway companies established in 1870
Railway companies disestablished in 1871
Defunct Michigan railroads
Central Michigan
Predecessors of the Pere Marquette Railway